Deshabandhu Vidyalaya Boys' (BM/HM) or D.V. Boys' (BM/HM) is a secondary school in Chittaranjan, West Bengal, India. It offers higher secondary education in Hindi medium and secondary education in Bengali medium. It is managed by the Chittaranjan Locomotive Works under the Ministry of Railways.

History 
The school was founded in 1951 by Ministry of Railways (Govt. of India). Initially school was set up to educate the children of Chittaranjan Locomotive Works employees.

Academics 
Bengali medium school operates during afternoons and Hindi medium school during mornings. The Hindi medium school follows the CBSE curriculum, with 1800 students. In the higher secondary stage it has Arts, Science and Commerce streams. The Bengali medium school is up to Madhyamik level and follows the West Bengal Board of Secondary Education.

All students are admitted through a common admission test.

Sports
D. V. Boys' is known for its inclination towards sports. The school has participated in and won several prizes in football and athletics.

Campus 
The school is on the Mihijam Fatehpur main road in the east of the Oval Ground and in front of Ambedkar Avenue. It has an area of 60 ha with Science and Mathematics labs for secondary students and Chemistry, Physics and Biology labs for Higher Secondary students. It has a large ground.

Achievements
The school has produced maximum number of doctors and engineers in the region. Alumni are spread across nearly 50 countries. Alumni are working as top-level managers in companies like P&G, TCS, Tata Steel, Maruti Suzuki (India), Reliance Industries Limited, Customs Department, GST Department under Government of India, etc. In academics fields students are well established in IIM, IIT, IISc, NITs, NID, AIIMS and indulge social works  through NGOs like SADDHAMMA PUSTAKALAYA, Mihijam (founded by 'Prahlad Kumar Ram').

See also
Education in India
List of schools in India
Education in West Bengal

References 

local newspapers and school authority

External links 

Boys' schools in India
High schools and secondary schools in West Bengal
Schools in Paschim Bardhaman district
Education in Asansol
Educational institutions established in 1951
1951 establishments in West Bengal